Go into Your Dance is a 1935 American musical drama film starring Al Jolson, Ruby Keeler, and Glenda Farrell. The film was directed by Archie Mayo and is based on the novel of the same name by Bradford Ropes. It was released by Warner Bros. on April 20, 1935. An irresponsible Broadway star gets mixed up with gambling and gangsters.

Plot
Broadway star Al Howard (Al Jolson) has a habit of walking out on hit shows. His sister Molly (Glenda Farrell) promises his agent he will never do it again, but he is banned from Broadway. Molly tracks Al down in Mexico, where he is on a binge and tells him she is done taking care of him. When Molly runs into Dorothy Wayne (Ruby Keeler) a friend who is a dancer, she begs Dorothy to form a team with Al, because she can get Al a job if he has a partner. At first Molly is reluctant but finally agreed.

It takes some work to convince Al, but he eventually agrees to form a team with Dorothy. They become a big success in Chicago. Dorothy falls in love with Al and thinking that he does not return her affection decides to quit the act. Al asks her to stay, telling her that he plans to open his own nightclub on Broadway. Molly introduces Al to Duke Hutchinson (Barton MacLane) a gangster who is willing to back the club as a showcase for his wife, Luana Bell (Helen Morgan) a torch singer who wants to make a comeback. Al flirts with Luana, Dorothy warns him about his involvement with Luana, but Al continues his flirtation with her. Duke gives Al an additional $30,000 to open the club, but before opening night, Al uses the money to post bond for Molly, who has been arrested on suspicion of murder.

When Al turns down a proposal from Luana, she angrily tells Duke the club will not open on schedule, and he sends gunmen to kill Al. At the last minute, Molly is cleared of the murder and the necessary money is returned, with the show opening on time and to great applause. Duke tries to call off his gunmen, but Luana does not give them the message. Al finally realizes that he is in love with Dorothy and asks her to dinner. As they step out the door, Dorothy sees the gunmen and throws her body in front of Al. She is wounded and as Al holds her, he tells Dorothy that he loves her. The doctor proclaims that Dorothy will be fine and Al's club is a huge success.

Cast

 Al Jolson as Al Howard
 Ruby Keeler as Dorothy 'Dot' Wayne
 Glenda Farrell as Molly Howard
 Barton MacLane as Duke Hutchinson
 Patsy Kelly as Irma 'Toledo' Knight
 Akim Tamiroff as Mexican in La Cucaracha Cantina
 Helen Morgan as Luana Wells
 Sharon Lynn as Nellie Lahey
 Benny Rubin as Drunk in La Cucaracha Cantina
 Phil Regan as Eddie 'Teddy' Rio
 Gordon Westcott as Fred
 William B. Davidson as Tom McGee 
 Joyce Compton as Café Showgirl
 Joseph Crehan as H.P. Jackson
 Arthur Treacher as Latimer 
 Russell Hicks as Sam Rupert 
 Ward Bond as Herman Lahey
 Theresa Harris as Luana's Maid
 Marc Lawrence as 	Eddie Logan 
 Robert Gleckler as Pete Brown
 Fred 'Snowflake' Toones as Snowflake 
 Henry Kolker as Doctor
 Mary Carr as Wardrobe Mistress
 Joyzelle Joyner as Cantina Dancer 
 Lita Chevret as Angry Showgirl
 Bobby Connolly as 	Dance Director

Production
This is the only film that stars both Al Jolson and Ruby Keeler, who were married at the time. Barton MacLane was billed as Barton Mac Lane. It was shot at the Burbank Studios in Hollywood with sets designed by the art director John Hughes. Go into Your Dance was released in Britain as Casino de Paris.

Years after the film's initial release, Jolson career was revitalized after the release of the 1946 Columbia Pictures film, The Jolson Story. Warner Bros. cashed in on the film's success by reissuing Go into Your Dance the following year. New opening titles were added which gave Jolson a solo over-the-title billing, as well as a written prologue to ensure audiences that the film took place in 1935. No other changes were added beyond the opening titles.

Songs
This film, a famous early musical, includes the numbers "About a Quarter to Nine" and "Latin From Manhattan" sung by Al Jolson. The former song was also recreated in color in the film The Jolson Story (1946). Dance director Bobby Connolly received an Academy Award nomination for his work on the "Latin from Manhattan". Other songs with music and lyrics by Harry Warren and Al Dubin include:
 Go into Your Dance
 The Little Things You Used to Do
 Mammy, I'll Sing About You
 Casino de Paree
 An Old Fashioned Cocktail with an Old Fashioned Girl

Reception
The New York Times movie review said: "On the debit side of the picture's ledger, one must report a dearth of comedy, a certain dragginess as the film reaches its half-way mark and Miss Keeler's not altogether successful attempt to do the rhumba, the tango and other "Spanish" dances. Her tap dancing is so much better. On the credit side are the Warren-Dubin songs, the absence—mark this!—of overhead shots of the chorus, Helen Morgan's rendition of "The Little Things You Used to Do", and Mr. Jolson. All told, "Go Into Your Dance" is not the best, not the worst, but generally above average for its type."

Box office
According to Warner Bros records the film earned $912,000 domestic and $489,000 foreign.

Home media
Warner Archive released the film on DVD on October 21, 2009.

References

Green, Stanley (1999) Hollywood Musicals Year by Year (2nd ed.), pub. Hal Leonard Corporation  page 43

External links
 
 
 
 

1935 films
Films directed by Archie Mayo
1930s musical drama films
Warner Bros. films
Films produced by Samuel Bischoff
American musical drama films
American black-and-white films
Films based on American novels
1935 drama films
1930s American films